WGSO (990 AM) is a news/talk/sports radio station based in New Orleans, Louisiana. The station, which is owned by Northshore Radio, LLC., broadcasts with 600 watts day and 310 watts night.

History
The station was originally an AM daytimer and throughout its life went through a series of call letters and formats before going 24 hours in the 1980s. In 2001 they gave New Orleans its first Business Talk format.  When it signed on January 20, 1947, it used the call sign WJMR owned by George Mayoral and broadcast from the Jung Hotel.  WJMR would become the sister station of WJMR-FM and WJMR-TV (New Orleans' second television station in 1953, now WVUE-DT).

In the mid-1950s it was home to "Poppa Stoppa" whose program featured long runs of uninterrupted Rock and Roll music. In 1964, when WJMR-TV was sold the station call sign was changed to WNNR (Winner Radio); it returned to the WJMR call letters between 1969 and 1972 but became WNNR again on January 24, 1972. The station briefly became WLTS in the fall of 1984. On June 4, 1985, it became WYAT (capitalizing on the local street expression "Where y'at?"), broadcasting a syndicated Oldies format with some local D.J.s during the day.

On December 1, 1993 the station became WGSO, broadcasting an audio feed of CNN's Headline News. From 2001 until Hurricane Katrina in 2005 the station was billed as "City Business 990," touting its relationship with the local "City Business" newspaper. 2004-2006 was known as "BizRadio 990" During this time there were local hosts during the day and syndicated programming and CNN newscasts overnight.

Post-Katrina (2007), the station used the "Voice of the Northshore" moniker, aiming its news & traffic reports at St. Tammany Parish. This was problematic, as the station's signal on the Northshore of Lake Pontchartrain is weak during the day and practically unlistenable at nighttime power.  By 2009, the station changed management and adapted "Speakin' Easy New Orleans Style" as their moniker.  Their lineup includes local programming during the day (including Jeff Crouere, Tom Fitzmorris and Tim McNally) and syndicated programs at night, such as Michael Savage, Joy Browne, and Ronald Hoffman.

Transmitter
The transmission power of WGSO is 600 watts day and 310 watts night. At all times omnidirectional pattern is used.

External links
WGSO 990's website

FCC History Cards for WGSO

WGSO
News and talk radio stations in the United States
Radio stations established in 1984